Culture Kultür is a Spanish electronic music project, working primarily in the EBM and synthpop genres.

History

Culture Kultür are frontman Salva Maine, Josua at the programming and Distortiongirl as live keyboardist. The band was born in 1992 in Málaga, Southern Spain, evolving from a 80s alike EBM with distorted voices to a more electro sound with energetic beats, melodic synths and meaningful lyrics boosted by powerful vocals.

After their signing with Out of Line in 1999 they have supported the Mexican band Hocico in the Tierra Electrica '99 Tour, played in mayor festivals as WGT, M'era Luna, Infest & Eurorock, performing gigs in USA, Mexico and Canada, and included dozens of songs in different compilations.

Their EP "DNA Slaves" reached the 10th position in DAC charts (German alternative charts), and their second album, Revenge, contains hits that have been spun all over the world, becoming a club classic.

The band released the album Reborn in June 2005; it reached position 3 at the DAC charts.

They released the album Spirit in 2010. On 21 January 2019 Culture Kultür released their fifth studio album Humanity.

Discography

Albums
 Bump! CD (Microscopic, 1998)
 Reflex CD (Out Of Line, 1999)
 Revenge CD (Out Of Line, 2001)
 Reborn CD (Out Of Line, 2005)
 Spirit CD (Caustic Records, 2010)
 Humanity CD (Caustic Records, 2019)

EPs
 Bass...Can You Hear Me? (1992)
 F.T.W. EP (1993)
 Spike	(Microscopic, 1996)
 Rev.-Time EP (Microscopic, 1996)
 Default (Microscopic, 1997)
 Aftermath (Microscopic, 1998)
 Manifesto EP (Out Of Line, 1999)
 DNA Slaves EP (Out Of Line, 1999)
 Combat EP (Out Of Line, 2002)

Synthpop groups